Cholane is a triterpene which can exist as either of two stereoisomers, 5α-cholane and 5β-cholane. The compound itself has no known uses. However, various functionalized analogues are produced by plants and animals, typically in the form of sterols, steroids and bile acids (e.g. cholic acid).

See also
 Cholestane
 Ergostane

References

External links
 

Triterpenes
Cholanes
Cyclopentanes